The Pyu language (also Tircul language) is an extinct Sino-Tibetan language that was mainly spoken in what is now Myanmar in the first millennium CE. It was the vernacular of the Pyu city-states, which thrived between the second century BCE and the ninth century CE. Its usage declined starting in the late ninth century when the Bamar people of Nanzhao began to overtake the Pyu city-states. The language was still in use, at least in royal inscriptions of the Pagan Kingdom if not in popular vernacular, until the late twelfth century. It became extinct in the thirteenth century, completing the rise of the Burmese language, the language of the Pagan Kingdom, in Upper Burma, the former Pyu realm.

The language is principally known from inscriptions on four stone urns (7th and 8th centuries) found near the Payagyi pagoda (in the modern Bago Township) and the multi-lingual Myazedi inscription (early 12th century). These were first deciphered by Charles Otto Blagden in the early 1910s.

The Pyu script was a Brahmic script. The most recent scholarship suggests the Pyu script may have been the source of the Burmese script.

Classification

Blagden (1911: 382) was the first scholar to recognize Pyu as an independent branch of Sino-Tibetan. Miyake (2021, 2022) argues that Pyu forms a branch of its own within the Sino-Tibetan language phylum due to its divergent phonological and lexical characteristics. Pyu is not a particularly conservative Sino-Tibetan language, as it displays many phonological and lexical innovations as has lost much of the original Proto-Sino-Tibetan morphology. Miyake (2022) suggests that this may be due to a possible creoloid origin of Pyu.

Pyu was tentatively classified within the Lolo-Burmese languages by Matisoff and thought to most likely be Luish by Bradley, although Miyake later showed that neither of these hypotheses are plausible. Van Driem also tentatively classified Pyu as an independent branch of Sino-Tibetan.

Phonology
Marc Miyake reconstructs the syllable structure of Pyu as:

(C.)CV(C)(H)
(preinitial) + syllable

7 vowels are reconstructed.

Miyake reconstructs 43-44 onsets, depending on whether or not the initial glottal stop is included. Innovative onsets are:

fricatives: /h ɣ ç ʝ ð v/
liquids: /R̥ R L̥ L/
implosive: /ɓ/

10 codas are reconstructed, which are -k, -t, -p, -m, -n, -ŋ, -j, -r, -l, -w. Pyu is apparently isolating, with no inflection morphology observed.

List of Pyu inscriptions

Vocabulary
Below are selected Pyu basic vocabulary items from Gordon Luce and Marc Miyake.

Sound changes
Pyu displays the following sound changes from Proto-Tibeto-Burman.

 sibilant chain shift: *c > *s > /h/
 denasalization: *m > /ɓ/ and possibly *ŋ > /g/
 *e-lowering: *e > /ä/
 *sC-cluster compression: *sk, *st, *sp > /kʰ, tʰ, pʰ/

Usage
The language was the vernacular of the Pyu states. But Sanskrit and Pali appeared to have co-existed alongside Pyu as the court language. The Chinese records state that the 35 musicians that accompanied the Pyu embassy to the Tang court in 800–802 played music and sang in the Fàn ( "Sanskrit") language.

Notes

References

Further reading
 
 Griffiths, Arlo, Marc Miyake & Julian K. Wheatley. 2021. Corpus of Pyu inscriptions.

External links
 The Pre-History of Pyu, Marc Miyake
 Searchable corpus of Pyu inscriptions
 Datasets for Pyu inscriptions, photographed by James Miles

Unclassified Sino-Tibetan languages
Languages of Myanmar
Languages attested from the 7th century
Languages extinct in the 13th century